Schinia graefiana is a moth of the family Noctuidae. It is found in South-Western North America, including California.

The wingspan is about 19 mm.

The larvae feed on Chaenactis species, including Chaenactis fremontii.

External links
Images

Schinia
Moths of North America
Moths described in 1882